Tufo may refer to:

People
 Gerardo Del Tufo (1909–1995), American politician
 Giovanni Battista del Tufo (1543–1622), Italian bishop
 Peter Tufo (born 1938), American diplomat
 Raymond Del Tufo Jr. (1919–1970), American lawyer and judge
 Robert Del Tufo (1933–2016), American politician

Places
 Tufo, Campania, Italy

Other
 Tufo (dance), traditional Mozambican dance